Třinec Iron and Steel Works (TŽ) is a producer of long rolled steel products in Třinec, Moravian-Silesian Region, Czech Republic. TŽ produces over a third of all steel produced in the Czech Republic (roughly 2.5 million tons annually). Since its establishment, Třinecké železárny's plants have produced more than 150 million tons of crude steel. Moravia Steel is the major shareholder of TŽ, the biggest Czech steel company controlled by domestic capital.

History 

The area was rich in limestone, iron ore, clay and had a source of energy (the Olza River). The area also offered enough of a work force and it lies on a trade route from Slovakia, so a decision was taken to build an iron works at the location. In 1836 the construction of the first metallurgical furnace began. The iron mill began operating in 1839, becoming the largest in all of Cieszyn Silesia. At first, wood coal was used to heat the furnace; wood was cut in the nearby Silesian Beskids and Moravian-Silesian Beskids and floated on the Olza River in spring when the snow melted and the water level in the river rose. The Olza River was the most important means of transport until the 1870s, when the factories were modernized and a water canal was built to provide more water. The Olza River was also used to flush out the waste from the iron works. The first water cleaning facility was built in 1927. Modern water cleaning systems ensure that the outflow from the factory is nearly as clean as the inflow.

Since 1920, when Cieszyn Silesia was divided, it has been one of the most important industrial centers of Czechoslovakia. TŽ was nationalized in 1946 and its development continued during the Communist era, when heavy industry was very important. It is the largest steel mill in the country and still has a major impact on the industrial town of Třinec and surrounding areas, on its character, demographics and air pollution, although the latter significantly decreased since the fall of communism in 1989.

From 1960s to 1980s it played major role in the life of the region. Iron and steel works helped to improve regional infrastructure, as well as the transport network. Many recreational centers in the Beskids were built.

Today 

It is the main employer in the area, with the Iron and Steel Works employing 5,519 people in 2005. The number of permanently employed workers has historically been declining, numbering 9,276 people in 1998, while during the communist era more than 15,000 worked there. The actual number of people working for TŽ is still somewhat higher, as many people are employed seasonally in brigade work and in affiliated facilities. The company is the main sponsor of the local ice hockey team HC Oceláři Třinec (Třinec Steelers).

The recent product portfolio of Třinecké železárny has been oriented to processing the steel produced mainly in BOF converters to the wide range of long rolled products, such as rails, railway superstructure accessories, rebars, sections, wire rod, steel semis and special bars. The products are sold through the commercial network of the controlling company Moravia Steel at the domestic as well at the export markets. Each year, roughly the half of production of the rolled products of TŽ is used by consumers in about 50 countries worldwide.

Třinec Iron and Steel Works are locally and colloquially known as Werk (the German word for factory).

The current chairman of Třinec Iron and Steel Works is (since 2012) Ing. Jan Czudek.

See also 
 Zaolzie

Footnotes

References

External links

Official Website
Gates Design & Ironwork

Třinec
Iron and steel mills
Steel companies of the Czech Republic
Manufacturing companies of Czechoslovakia
Buildings and structures in the Moravian-Silesian Region